Asaph Clayton Vanderwater Elston (September 9, 1845 – July 28, 1914) was a member of the Wisconsin State Assembly. He was born on September 9, 1845 in Unionville, Orange County, New York. Occupations he held include banker and merchant. He died on July 28, 1914 in Muscoda, Wisconsin. He was elected to the Assembly in 1888 as a Republican.

References

External links
 

1845 births
1914 deaths
People from Orange County, New York
People from Grant County, Wisconsin
Republican Party members of the Wisconsin State Assembly
American bankers
19th-century American merchants